Positive Alternatives to Homosexuality (PATH) is a coalition of groups that purport to help "people with unwanted same-sex attractions (SSA) realize their personal goals for change—whether by developing their innate heterosexual potential or by embracing a lifestyle as a single, non-sexually active man or woman." The predominantly ex-gay member groups promote the "right to decide whether to seek counseling or therapy" and abstinence. The coalition lists studies on reparative therapy and links to organizations that work with people who have unwanted same-sex attractions.

Criticism
A number of professional and activist organizations sharply disagree with PATH goals.  According to PFLAG, PATH is an anti-equality organization that "pursues discredited and profoundly damaging reparative therapy, as evidenced by the company the organization keeps."  Most mental health professionals and the American Psychological Association consider reparative therapy discredited.

Member organizations
In July 2003, various organizations united to form PATH.  As of June 2014, PATH has 26 partner organizations:
 American College of Pediatricians
 Anglican Mainstream (UK)
 Core (Christian, Northern Ireland)
 Courage International (Catholic)
 Family Watch International
 German Institute for Youth and Society
 Help 4 Families (gender identity issues)
 Homosexuals Anonymous (Christian)
 International Healing Foundation
 International Institute of Reorientation Therapies
 Jason (Christian)
 Jews Offering New Alternatives for Healing (JONAH)
 Jonah Institute of Gender Affirmation
 National Association for Research & Therapy of Homosexuality (NARTH)
 North Star (Latter-day Saints)
 OneByOne (Presbyterian)
 Parakaleo (Christian, UK, gender identity issues)
 Parents and Friends of Ex-Gays and Gays (PFOX)
 Brothers on a Road Less Traveled (formerly People Can Change)
 Powerful Change Ministry Group (Christian, African-American)
 Renacer (Mexico)
 Transforming Congregations (Methodist)
 True Freedom Trust (United Kingdom, Christian)
 VenSer (Mexico, Christian)
 Voices of Change
 Joel 2:25 International

Exodus International belonged to the initial members, but left in April 2007.

See also

Ex-gay movement
Ex-ex-gay

References

External links
Positive Alternatives to Homosexuality, Official website

Organizations in the ex-gay movement